Trójmorski Wierch (in Polish until 1946 Klepacz) is a peak in the Snieznik Mountains range. It lies on the Czech Republic–Poland border.

It is a triple point of the European watershed. Water from the peak may flow  either to the Baltic Sea via Eastern Neisse and Oder, to the Black Sea via Morava and Danube and to the North Sea via Orlice and Elbe. The current Polish name, meaning the Three Seas Peak, is derived from this hydrological feature. It was introduced in 1946 by Mieczysław Orłowicz.

The Czech, German and former Polish names are based on the clapping sound made by loose stones scattered on the peak in high winds or upon stepping on them.

References

Mountains of Poland
Mountains and hills of the Czech Republic